Kamayagoundanpatti is a panchayat town in Theni district in the Indian state of Tamil Nadu.

Demographics
 India census, Kamayagoundanpatti is a beautiful village in cumbum valley located near the bank of the river mullaiperiyar. It is an agricultural village had a population of 12,165. Males constitute 48% of the population and females 52%. Kamayagoundanpatti has an average literacy rate of 61%, higher than the national average of 59.5%: male literacy is 69%, and female literacy is 54%. In Kamayagoundanpatti, 11% of the population is under 6 years of age.there are lot of caste available in this village.
Located in State Highways, 6 km south of Uthamapalayam and 4 km east of Cumbum, surrounded by Megamalai in the east and by western ghats of Suruli Hills in the south and Cumbum mettu hills in the west.

References 

Cities and towns in Theni district